Ten Days' Wonder is a 1971 French murder-mystery film directed by Claude Chabrol and starring Michel Piccoli, Anthony Perkins, and Orson Welles. It is based on the novel Ten Days' Wonder by Ellery Queen.

It follows the same story of the novel with the exception of detective Ellery Queen being changed to Paul Regis (Michel Piccoli). It was the fourth film that Welles and Perkins appeared in together since The Trial in 1962.

Cast
Anthony Perkins as Charles Van Horn
Michel Piccoli as Paul Regis
Marlène Jobert as Helene Van Horn
Orson Welles as Theo Van Horn
Tsilla Chelton as Theo's mother
Guido Alberti as Ludovic
Ermanno Casanova as One-Eyed Old Man
Mathilde Ceccarelli as Receptionist

References

External links

1971 films
1971 crime drama films
Films directed by Claude Chabrol
French crime drama films
Italian crime drama films
1970s mystery drama films
Films with screenplays by Paul Gégauff
Films based on American novels
English-language French films
English-language Italian films
1970s English-language films
1970s French films
1970s Italian films
Ellery Queen films